Acanthaxius is a genus of  mud lobster native to the Indo-Pacific oceans.

Species

The genus Acanthaxius includes the following species:

Acanthaxius formosa Kensley & Chan, 1998
Acanthaxius garawa Poore & Collins, 2009
Acanthaxius gathaagudu Poore & Collins, 2009
Acanthaxius grandis Kensley & Chan, 1998
Acanthaxius kashimaensis Sakai, 2017Acanthaxius miyazakiensis (Yokoya, 1933)Acanthaxius ningaloo Poore & Collins, 2009Acanthaxius pilocheirus (Sakai, 1987)Acanthaxius polyacanthus (Miyake & Sakai, 1967)Acanthaxius sapulo Poore, 2020

Thee following species were formerly included in Acanthaxius but have been transferred to other genera:Amakusaxius amakusanus (Miyake & Sakai, 1967)Guyanacaris caespitosa (Squires, 1979)Guyanacaris hirsutimanus (Boesch & Smalley, 1972)Guyanacaris polychaetes Sakai, 1994Guyanacaris spinosissimus (Rathbun, 1906)Pillsburyaxius clevai (Ngoc-Ho, 2006)Pillsburyaxius gadaletae (Ngoc-Ho, 2006)Pillsburyaxius kirkmilleri (Kensley, 1996)

Three species of Acanthaxius'' have been found off the Solomon Islands.

References 

Thalassinidea